Archibald Richard Harenc (20 September 1821 – 5 August 1884) was an English soldier and amateur cricketer who played in 12 first-class cricket matches between 1840 and 1859.

Early life
Harenc was born in 1821 at Foots Cray in Kent, the youngest son of Benjamin Harenc who owned Foots Cray Place, an 18th-century neo-Palladian house built in the style of the Villa Rotunda which had been purchased by Charles' grandfather, also named Benjamin, in 1772. The Harenc family were originally Huguenot refugees from France and Harenc's grandfather established a silk mill at Foots Cray in 1775 and served as High Sheriff of Kent in 1777.

Harenc's father was an East India Company merchant and a keen cricketer, playing for Prince's Plain, a club which preceded the West Kent club; his mother Sophia was a member of the Berens family which was closely associated with the club. Archibland was educated at Harrow School between 1832 and 1836.

Cricket

Harrenc mainly played cricket for amateur sides, including the Gentlemen of Kent and Gentlemen of England, although he made two appearances for Kent sides in 1840 before the formation of the first Kent County Cricket Club. Twelve of the matches he played in are now considered to be first-class; Harenc scored a total of 53 runs and took 36 wickets in these matches. He is not recorded as having played cricket at school, but was an effective bowler in amateur cricket. Whilst serving in the Army he played for Canada against the United States at Montreal in 1845. His brothers, Charles, Henry and Edward also played first-class cricket, Charles for Kent teams.

Military career
Harenc served in the British Army from 1842, joining 97th Regiment of Foot as an Ensign. He served during the Indian Mutiny of 1858–1859 as a Captain, seeing action at a number of locations, including the Siege of Lucknow and was awarded the Indian Mutiny Medal and Mentioned in Dispatches. He was promoted to the rank of Lieutenant-colonel in 1860, transferring to the 53rd Regiment of Foot, commanding the regiment between 1864 and 1870. He retired with the rank of Lieutenant-general.

Family and later life
Harenc married Amy Farquharson in 1862 and Blandford Forum in Dorset; the couple had four children. His primary residence was recorded in his obituary as being Kimpton House near Welwyn in Hertfordshire. He died at Langton Matravers in Dorset in 1884 aged 62.

Notes

References

External links

1821 births
1884 deaths
English cricketers
Kent cricketers
Marylebone Cricket Club cricketers
Gentlemen of Kent cricketers
Gentlemen of England cricketers
Gentlemen of Kent and Sussex cricketers